Chemin d'Aylmer is an east–west main arterial road in Gatineau, Quebec. It starts near les Galeries d'Aylmer shopping centre and ends at Boulevard Saint-Raymond where it becomes Boulevard Alexandre-Tache heading towards downtown Gatineau and Ottawa. West of the shopping centre, it becomes Rue Principale until the Aylmer Marina on the eastern shores of the Ottawa River.

Traffic
This is still considered Aylmer's main commuter routes, as it is only one of two (soon three) that heads towards bridges to Ottawa. Chemin d'Aylmer gives access to the Champlain Bridge towards Tunney's Pasture and Westboro. In the past, there were major lineups that slowed traffic on that route. The bridge added a reversible carpooling lane in 2004 which eased up the delays during the morning rush hour.

STO routes follows a designated bus lane between Vanier Road and continues east towards downtown. The Rivermead and Hippodrome park and rides are located near Rivermead route and represents the main transit hub of the sector, however most routes travels in both sides of it.

Facilities
This road may also be called Golf Road as there are 5 golf courses all along its route. There are many other features all along this route including the Sheraton Chateau Cartier, Aylmer's most important hotel, located in the middle of 3 golf courses.

Neighbourhoods
 Rivermead 
 Lakeview Terrace
 Glenwood/Vieux Moulin
 Deschènes
 Pilon-Seigneurie Lavigne

References

 List of Gatineau roads

Streets in Gatineau